Liaw Der-cheng (born 17 September 1964) is a Taiwanese judoka. He competed in the men's lightweight event at the 1984 Summer Olympics.

References

1964 births
Living people
Taiwanese male judoka
Olympic judoka of Taiwan
Judoka at the 1984 Summer Olympics
Place of birth missing (living people)
Asian Games medalists in judo
Judoka at the 1990 Asian Games
Asian Games bronze medalists for Chinese Taipei
Medalists at the 1990 Asian Games
21st-century Taiwanese people
20th-century Taiwanese people